Mark W. Ryan (November 9, 1924 – February 18, 1985) was an American politician who was a member of the Wisconsin State Assembly.

Biography
Ryan was born  in Milwaukee, Wisconsin. He attended Washington High School, as well as Wisconsin State College of Milwaukee, Spencerian College and the University of Wisconsin–Milwaukee. During World War II, he served in the United States Navy. Ryan was a member of the Veterans of Foreign Wars, the American Legion and Catholic War Veterans, as well as the Knights of Columbus and the Fraternal Order of Eagles.

Political career
Ryan was elected to the Assembly in 1960. He was a Democrat.

References

Politicians from Milwaukee
Democratic Party members of the Wisconsin State Assembly
Military personnel from Wisconsin
United States Navy sailors
United States Navy personnel of World War II
University of Wisconsin–Milwaukee alumni
1924 births
1985 deaths
20th-century American politicians